Cottonwood Creek Bridge may refer to:
Cottonwood Creek Bridge (Colorado Springs, Colorado)
Cottonwood Creek Bridge (Ismay, Montana)

See also
Cottonwood Creek (disambiguation)
Cottonwood Creek Archeological Site (disambiguation)
Cottonwood Creek Ranch Airport, Malheur County, Oregon